Emilio Sala, also known as Elio Salya (Ukrainian: Еліо Саля; 30 April 1864, in Milan – 10 January 1920, in Milan) was an Italian-born sculptor and painter who spent most of his working life in Kyiv, Ukraine.

Biography 
In 1890, he and his brother were invited to Russia  to work on the Moika Palace in Saint Petersburg. After two years of work there, he heard about the plans to build a new museum in Kyiv and offered his services. As Italian artists were very popular in the Russian Empire, he was accepted and began to create designs.

From 1897 to 1905, he produced griffins and lions for what is now called the National Art Museum of Ukraine. During that project, he struck up a very fruitful working relationship with the architect Władysław Horodecki. He also designed various decorations for the Karaite Synagogue, the National Bank of Ukraine, St. Nicholas Roman Catholic Cathedral, Igor Sikorsky Kyiv Polytechnic Institute and the National Opera of Ukraine.

Unquestionably, though, his best known work is on the House with Chimaeras (also designed by Horodecki); a flamboyant Art Nouveau-style building for which Sala created fantastical cement renderings of elephants, panthers, rhinoceroses, giant frogs and other exotic animals.

In addition to his architectural work, he taught sculpture at an art school and a trade college. At the outbreak of World War I, he returned to Milan, where he died six years later.

References

External links

 Arcadja Auctions: Small works by Sala.

Art Nouveau sculptors
1864 births
1920 deaths
20th-century Italian sculptors
20th-century Italian male artists
19th-century Italian sculptors
Italian male sculptors
Ukrainian male sculptors
Ukrainian sculptors
19th-century Italian male artists